Claudio Raja Gabaglia Lins is a Brazilian diplomat. He served as Brazil's ambassador to Pakistan from 21 August 2015 to January 2020. On 12 March 2020, Lins presented his credentials as Brazil's ambassador to the Bahamas.

During his tenure as envoy in Islamabad, Lins expanded Brazil's economic cooperation with Pakistan by overseeing the establishment of the Pakistan-Brazil Business Forum and also focused on diplomatic and cultural ties.

References

Living people
Ambassadors of Brazil to the Bahamas
Ambassadors of Brazil to Pakistan
Year of birth missing (living people)